Miss St. Barthélemy is a national beauty pageant in Saint Barthélemy.

History
In 2011, Johanna Sansano was the first Miss World contestant to represent Saint Barthélemy.

Titleholders 
Color key

References

St. Barthelemy
Recurring events established in 2011
French awards
Saint Barthélemy culture
2011 establishments in Saint Barthélemy